Tim Henman and Nenad Zimonjić were the defending champions. They were both present but did not compete together. 
Henman partnered with Yves Allegro and Zimonjić with Leander Paes.

Leander Paes and Nenad Zimonjić won in the finals by a walkover against Bob Bryan and Mike Bryan

Seeds
All seeds receive a bye into the second round.

Draw

Finals

Top half

Bottom half

External links
Association of Tennis Professionals (ATP) doubles draw

Doubles